Mount Clemens Community School District is a school district headquartered in Mount Clemens, Michigan, United States. The school district was established in 1834.

Schools

Secondary schools
 Mount Clemens High School (9-12)
 Mount Clemens Middle School (6-8)

Primary schools
 Seminole Academy (K-5)
 Martin Luther King Jr. Academy (Pre-K)

References

External links
 Mount Clemens Community School District

Education in Macomb County, Michigan
School districts in Michigan
1834 establishments in Michigan Territory
School districts established in 1834